Akiba McKinney (born March 9, 1979) is an American former track and field athlete who specialized in the long jump. She finished in third place at the U.S. Olympic trials in 2004, falling just short of qualifying for the Athens Olympic Games. She is most remembered as the United States Indoor Champion for the long jump in both 2006 and 2007.

References 

Living people
1979 births
American female long jumpers
Track and field athletes from California
Sportspeople from San Bernardino, California
21st-century American women